László F. Földényi (born 19 April 1952 in Debrecen) is a Hungarian critic, essayist and art theorist. He lives in Budapest where he is Professor of Art Theory at the University of Theatre, Film and Television. He has been a member of the German Academy for Language and Literature since 2009.

Works
Having published over 15 books, Földényi is a prolific writer. However only three collections of essays have been translated and published in English.

Melancholy
Melancholy, a cultural history of the concept, was published in Hungarian in 1984 and not translated into English until 2016. In an essay on melancholia, noted writer Péter Nádas suggests that as a practicing melancholic, Földényi has written a book that ‘provides a realization [about melancholy] similar to the one modern astronomy reaches about black holes’. Földényi posits that eminent artists are often melancholic as they are aware of their mortality.

Dostoyevsky Reads Hegel in Siberia and Bursts into Tears
Dostoyevsky Reads Hegel in Siberia and Bursts into Tears is a collection of Földényi’s essays spanning the two decades to 2015. The book is considered by some critics to be a critique with religious undertones of an overly rational Enlightenment tradition. Writing in The New Yorker, James Wood labelled the book's depiction of the Enlightenment a 'grievous caricature.' In spite of these criticisms, the essays can be considered a demonstration of the author's erudition and knowledge of intellectual history.

Prizes
Blue Salon Prize of the Literaturhaus Frankfurt (2002)
Friedrich-Gundolf Prize of the German Academy of Language and Literature (2005)
Leipzig Book Award for European Understanding (2020)
Darmstadt Jury Literature Prize (2020)

Bibliography 

Melancholy, translated by Tim Wilkinson, Yale University Press, 2016, 
Dostoyevsky Reads Hegel in Siberia and Bursts into Tears, translated by Ottilie Mulzet, Yale University Press, 2020, 
The Glance of the Medusa: The Physiognomy of Mysticism, translated by Jozefina Komporaly, University of Chicago Press, 2021,

Critical studies and reviews of Földényi's work
Dostoyevsky reads Hegel in Siberia and bursts into tears

References

1952 births
Living people
Members of the German Academy for Language and Literature
21st-century Hungarian male writers